The Decree-Law 15/93 of January 22 is a Portuguese drug control law implementing the 1988 United Nations Convention Against Illicit Traffic in Narcotic Drugs and Psychotropic Substances.
It classifies substances into six categories, Table I through Table VI. Tables I and II are each further broken down into classes: A, B, and C.

This law was also the first that created the crime of money laundering in Portuguese law, and has been amended 25 times since 1993.

The introduction of the law, which is primarily aimed at controlling drug trafficking, says that although the use of drugs is socially censurable, that "does not prevent drug addicts from being seen in the first place as persons who are in need of medical assistance" who should receive care.  Thus, "drug consumers are presently legally punishable in an almost symbolic fashion" that encourages treatment.

While drug use is illegal in Portugal, the law's introduction notes of occasional drug users: "it is necessary above all to avoid them being labelled, marginalised, pushed into an impasse or towards avenues whose only way out is drugs." However, the Portuguese government condemned the Dutch pragmatic policy, well known for its absence of user punishment.

Drug trafficking is punished with very harsh sentences; in the most severe cases, it can be punished by 10 years to 25 years of imprisonment.

Table I

Class A

Diamorphine (Heroin)
Morphine
Opium
6-Monoacetylmorphine (6-MAM)
Hydromorphone
Pethidine
Methadone
Hydrocodone
Oxycodone
Fentanyl (and all its analogues, i.e. alphamethylfentanyl (AMF; China White), alfentanil, sufentanil, carfentanil, etc.)
Ketobemidone
Levorphanol
Oxymorphone
MPPP

Class B
Coca in all forms and all derivatives including:
Cocaine or Crack cocaine
Ecgonine (and all derivatives of ecgonine)

Class C
Cannabis and all derivatives in any form, including tetrahydrocannabinol, but excepting cannabinol

Table II

Class A

Hallucinogens, including:
2C family
LSD
MDMA (Ecstasy)
Psilocin
Psilocybin
Peyote
Mescaline
Phencyclidine
Stimulants
4-Methyl-aminorex
Sedative-hypnotics
gamma-Hydroxybutyrate (GHB)

Class B

Amphetamine stimulants including:
Amphetamine
Dextroamphetamine
Methamphetamine and levomethamphetamine
Tetrahydrocannabinol
Zipeprol
Other stimulants, including anorectics
Methylphenidate
Cathine
Cathinone
Methcathinone
Phendimetrazine
Fenethylline

Class C

Barbiturates
Amobarbital
Butabarbital
Butalbital
Cyclobarbital
Pentobarbital
Secobarbital
Benzodiazepines
Flunitrazepam
Opioids
Buprenorphine
Codeine
Pentazocine
Propoxyphene
Other sedative-hypnotics
Mecloqualone
Methaqualone
Glutethimide

Table III
Table III includes special preparations which may include limited amounts of any of the controlled drugs listed under Tables I and II.

Table IV

Stimulants (mostly anorectics)
Amfepramone
Aminorex
Clobenzorex
Ethylamphetamine
Fencamfamine
Fenproporex
Lefetamine
Mefenorex
Mazindol
Pemoline
Pipradrol
Propylhexedrine
Pyrovalerone
All benzodiazepines (including temazepam, but not including flunitrazepam)
Barbiturates
Allobarbital
Barbital
Butobarbital
Methylphenobarbital
Phenobarbital
Secbutabarbital
Vinylbital
Other sedative-hypnotics
Ethchlorvynol
Ethinamate
Methyprylon
Zolpidem
Meprobamate
Mesocarb

Table V and VI
Tables V and VI comprise precursor substances (and salts thereof) which may be used to manufacture drugs listed under Tables I and II.

Table V

N-Acetylanthranilic acid
Ephedrine
Ergometrine
Ergotamine
Isosafrole
Lysergic acid
3,4-Methylenedioxyphenyl-2-propanone
Norephedrine
1-Phenyl-2-propanone
Piperonal
Pseudoephedrine
Safrole

Table VI

Acetic anhydride
Acetone
Anthranilic acid
Diethyl ether
Hydrochloric acid
Methyl ethyl ketone
Phenylacetic acid
Piperidine
Potassium permanganate
Sulfuric acid
Toluene

See also
Drug policy
Drug prohibition law
Illegal drug trade

Notes

References

External links
Classification of Controlled Drugs
 Full text of the law at the Diário da República Eletrónico

1993 in law
Drug control law
Law of Portugal
1993 in Portugal
Drug policy of Portugal
15 93